Vilaine (Naughty) is a 2008 French comedy film directed and written by Jean-Patrick Benes and Allan Mauduit.

Plot
Melanie was the whipping girl in her class. Today, she has remained an unattractive woman, overwhelmed by her boss and her neighbor, a little too sweet and indulgent. Naive and generous, she falls into the trap of her beautiful and wicked cousin Aurore in believing in Prince Charming. Determined to get revenge, Melanie becomes "naughty" and exploits her boss, does dirty tricks to Aurore's friends, and gives "tips" advised everyone, calculated in advance, of course.

Cast
 Marilou Berry as Mélanie Lupin
 Chantal Lauby as Mélanie's mother
 Frédérique Bel as Aurore Cahier
 Joséphine de Meaux as Blandine
 Alice Pol as Jessica
 Pierre-François Martin-Laval as Martinez
 Thomas N'Gijol as Innocent Drogba
 Gil Alma as Jonathan
 Charles Meurisse as Aymeric
 Isabelle Mazin as Madame Lepinsec
 Chantal Ravalec as Mademoiselle Stanpinski
 Marie Bach as Delphine
 Liliane Rovère as Mélanie's grandmother
 Léa Pelletant as Blandine's mother
 Claudia Tagbo as The Mom at the airport
 Juliette Galoisy as The journalist
 Eric Laugérias as Elephant cop
 Stéphane Blancafort as De Niro cop
 Eric Moncoucut as Nice cop
 Théo Ponce-Ludier as The flower kid
 Alexandre Trijoulet as The monk

References

External links

2008 films
French comedy films
2000s French films